Jonas Samuelson is a Swedish businessman. He serves as the president and chief executive officer of Electrolux.

References

Living people
Swedish chief executives
Year of birth missing (living people)